The Sudan Liberation Movement/Army ( Ḥarakat Taḥrīr Al-Sūdān; abbreviated SLM, SLA, or SLM/A) is a Sudanese rebel group active in Darfur, Sudan. It was founded as the Darfur Liberation Front by members of three indigenous ethnic groups in Darfur: the Fur, the Zaghawa, and the Masalit, among whom were the leaders Abdul Wahid al Nur of the Fur and Minni Minnawi of the Zaghawa.

Formation
General Omar al-Bashir and the National Islamic Front headed by Dr. Hassan al-Turabi overthrew the Sudanese government led by Ahmed al-Mirghani in 1989. A large section of the population in Darfur, particularly the non-Arab ethnicities in the region, became increasingly marginalized. These feelings were crystallized by the publication in 2000 of The Black Book, which detailed the structural inequity in the Sudan that denies non-Arabs equal justice and power sharing. In 2002 Abdul Wahid al Nur, a lawyer, Ahmad Abdel Shafi Bassey, an education student, and a third man founded the Darfur Liberation Front, which subsequently evolved into the Sudan Liberation Movement and claimed to represent all of the oppressed in the Sudan.

2008 Sun Air hijacking 
In August 2008, a local Sun Air Boeing 737 carrying 100 passengers including 5 crew members, was hijacked by members belonging to the Sudan Liberation Movement or SLM. The regional flight operated by the private Sudanese airlines Sun Air was enroute from Nyala, South Darfur to Khartoum when it was diverted by the Darfuri rebels to the oasis town of Kufra, in the far south of Libya. SLM leader Abdelwahid al-Nur who lived in Paris at the time, denied his involvement in the hijacking and condemned the rebels' use of hijacking to bring attention to their cause.  SLA field commander Ibrahim al-Hillo suggested the Boeing hijackers could be al-Nur sympathizers as the SLA had started to break up at the time of hijacking. The 95 passengers were eventually freed unharmed and the 5 crew members were also released. Al Nur said of the hijacking that Khartoum was attempting to manipulate the hijacking news as a tactic to draw attention away from the government's earlier attack on the Kalma refugee camp which killed 70 civilians. Kalma camp is located near the Nyala airport. The hijackers were detained by Libyan authorities. While the government attack occurred close to the hijacking, it didn't appear to be a motive for the hijacking.

Libyan involvement 
Before the overthrow of Muammar Gaddafi during the Libyan Civil War (2011), the Libyan Armed Forces were known to support at least parts of the SLM/A, such as the SLA-Unity. In turn, elements of the SLM/A reportedly became involved in the Second Libyan Civil War, fighting for different factions there in exchange for money and equipment. The SLM/A-Minnawi allied itself with the Khalifa Haftar-aligned Libyan National Army (LNA), and fought alongside it in the Battle of Derna (2018–2019), losing several fighters in combat for the town. On 12 January 2019, SLM/A-Minnawi clashed with the Chadian CCMSR rebel group (an enemy of the LNA) at Gatroun in southern Libya. Later that month, the SLM/A was accused by the CCMSR of aiding a LNA offensive in southern Libya.

Groups and factions

Main factions

In 2006, the Sudan Liberation Movement split into two main factions, divided on the issue of the Darfur Peace Agreement:

 Sudan Liberation Movement/Army (Minnawi) (abbreviated SLM (Minnawi) or SLA-MM) - this group is led by Minni Minnawi and signed the 2006 (Abuja) Darfur Peace Agreement in May 2006. Minnawi served as the Chairperson of the Transitional Darfur Regional Authority from its formation in 2007 to his dismissal in December 2010. The SLM-Minnawi faction formally withdrew from the peace agreement in February 2011. Unlike most other SPLM/A factions, SLA-MM was active not just in Darfur, but also took part in the Sudanese conflict in South Kordofan and Blue Nile. The group has also taken part in the South Sudanese Civil War, fighting for the South Sudanese government against various rebel factions. SLM-Minnawi was a participant in the 2019 Sudanese peace process .
Sudan Liberation Movement/Army (al-Nur) (abbreviated SLM (al-Nur), SLM-AW, and SLA-AW) - this group was formed in 2006 and is led by Abdul Wahid al Nur. It rejected the 2006 (Abuja) Darfur Peace Agreement. The SLM/A (al-Nur) does not officially insist on independence. The group includes both male as well as female fighters. The group has also taken part in the South Sudanese Civil War, fighting for the South Sudanese government against various rebel factions. The SLM/A (al-Nur) maintains its stronghold in the Marrah Mountains as of 2021, holding a territory inhabited by about 300,000 people. The area is factually self-sufficient and mostly isolated from the rest of the Sudan. It runs a factual government there, training new troops, but has also built several schools, where hundreds of children receive an education daily. SLM/A (al-Nur) rejected the 2019 Sudanese peace process, arguing that Arab militias continued their attacks in Darfur and that the new Sovereignty Council of Sudan included many old commanders of Bashir. However, the group was suffering from internal tensions at this point, as some of its factions were clashing with each other. One splinter group led by Zanoun Abdulshafi had begun to fight alongside the Arab militias. Fighting between SLM/A (al-Nur) and pro-government forces continues as of 2021.

Other smaller splinter groups

Sudan Liberation Movement (Historic Leadership) - this group split from the al-Nur faction and is led by Osman Ibrahim Musa. It signed a peace agreement with the government of South Darfur in January 2011.
Sudan Liberation Movement (General Command) - formed in November 2010 by former members of the SLM factions and the former members of the Justice and Equality Movement (JEM). It is led by Adam Ali Shogar.
Sudan Liberation Movement (Mainstream) - this group is led by Mohamed Al Zubeir Khamis.
Sudan Liberation Movement (Unity) - This group emerged as multi-tribal alliance of rebel groups from northern Darfur after the Abuja peace talks. Though it has no real political plan, the alliance stresses good relations with the people of Darfur and rejected Minnawi's faction for its attacks on civilians. In general, it is poorly armed and rather weak.
 SLA-Unity (1) - The main sub-faction, led by several commanders with Abdalla Yahya, Ahmad Kubbur, and Sherif Harir  being the most notable. SLA-Unity (1) was weakened by defections to JEM in 2009, but claimed they have recovered from that setback later on.
 SLA-Unity (2) - A splinter group led by Mahjoub Hussein, a former commander in the Minnawi faction and the leader of the short-lived "Greater Sudan Liberation Movement". Supported by Libya, he claimed to be the new leader of SLA-Unity in 2009, but managed to rally almost none of Unity group's militias to his cause.
Sudan Liberation Forces Alliance or  SLFA - created in July 2017 by joining together a faction of SLM-Unity, Sudan Liberation Movement for Justice, and a faction of the Justice and Equality Movement led by Abdallah Bishr Gali. , SLFA's chair was al-Tahir Abu Bakr Hajar and Abdallah Yahia the deputy chair.
Sudan Liberation Movement (Second Revolution) (abbreviated SLM-SR) - this faction was founded as splinter group of SLM/A (al-Nur) in 2014, and is led by Abul Gasim Imam. It takes part in the conflicts of Darfur, South Kordofan, and Blue Nile, and participated in peace talks with the Sudanese government in 2016.
Sudan Liberation Movement-Transitional Council or SLM-TC - , SLM-TC was led by al-Hadi Idris Yahya, as a breakaway group from SLM (al-Nur); SLM-TC was opposed to negotiations with Sudanese president Omar al-Bashir and participated in the Sudan Call alliance.

August 2020 peace agreement
Minni Minawi signed a peace agreement on behalf of the Sudan Liberation Movement with the Transitional Government of Sudan on 31 August 2020 and the organisation will now participate in the transition to democracy in Sudan through peaceful means. Under the terms of the agreement, the factions that signed will be entitled to three seats on the sovereignty council, a total of five ministers in the transitional cabinet and a quarter of seats in the transitional legislature. At a regional level, signatories will be entitled between 30 and 40% of the seats on transitional legislatures of their home states or regions.

References

Works cited

External links
Sudan Liberation Movement/Army

al-Nur, Abdel Wahid "SLM statement on the secular state" Sudan Tribune 3 January 2007, from Internet Archive
Reed, Ryan Spencer (2007) "Darfur Photographic Exhibition - The Cost of Silence" - Documentary photographer's images of Sudan's rebels including the Sudan Liberation Army

2002 establishments in Sudan
Guerrilla organizations
National liberation movements
Rebel groups in Sudan
Separatism in Sudan
Sudan Revolutionary Front
War in Darfur